Save River may refer to:
 Save River (Africa) - a river in Africa
 Save (Garonne) - a river in France
 Sava River - a river in the Balkans, also spelt Save in some sources.